The 2003–04 season was the 95th season in the history of Levante UD and the club's fifth consecutive season in the second division of Spanish football. In addition to the domestic league, Levante participated in this season's edition of the Copa del Rey.

Players
 Mora
 Aizpurúa
 Ruiz Caba
 Juanra
 Pinillos
 Descarga
 Rubiales
 Félix

Transfers

Pre-season and friendlies

Competitions

Overall record

Segunda División

League table

Results summary

Results by round

Matches

Copa del Rey

References

Levante UD seasons
Levante UD